John Brill may refer to:

 John Brill (photographer) (born 1951), American photographer
 John Frederick Brill (died 1942), English soldier and painter
 John George Brill (1817–1888), manufacturer of streetcars and interurban cars in the United States